Keota is a town in northeastern Haskell County, Oklahoma, United States. The population was 438 at the 2020 census, a 22.3 percent decrease over the figure of 564 recorded in 2010.

History
The town was first called "KeeOtter", which was later changed to "Keota". The town's name may come from a Choctaw word meaning "the fire gone out", referring to an entire tribe being destroyed by disease, or may be derived from "Jim Keese", a rancher who owned the land where the townsite was located, and "Otter," for Otter Creek, a tributary of the Sans Bois Creek which winds its way through town.

Keota was founded in 1904 by the Midland Valley Railroad's land company, and a post office was established in 1905.

By 1911, the town supported several businesses, a hotel, and a lumberyard. The town supported local cotton growers, and was a railroad shipping point for their product.

The Great Depression caused Keota's population to fall from 494 in 1920 to 470 in 1930, though it rebounded to 619 by 1970.

In 1971, the McClellan–Kerr Arkansas River Navigation System was established on the Arkansas River, about 10 miles north of Keota.  A dam on the river created the Robert S. Kerr Reservoir, which reaches to Keota.  This enabled the Port of Keota to be established. Light industry was beginning to be drawn to the town at the end of the twentieth century, though by 2013, little remained of the port but a boatlaunch The railway had long been abandoned.

On December 31, 1974, the nearby Otter Creek Archaeological Site (NR 74001661) was listed on the National Register of Historic Places.

At the time of its founding, Keota was located in Moshulatubbee District, Choctaw Nation.

Geography

Demographics

As of the census of 2000, there were 517 people, 204 households, and 140 families residing in the town. There were 230 housing units at an average density of 617.6 per square mile (240.0/km2). The racial makeup of the town was 81.43% White, 12.19% Native American, 0.19% Asian, 2.71% from other races, and 3.48% from two or more races. Hispanic or Latino of any race were 4.84% of the population.

There were 204 households, out of which 36.8% had children under the age of 18 living with them, 54.9% were married couples living together, 10.3% had a female householder with no husband present, and 30.9% were non-families. 29.9% of all households were made up of individuals, and 14.7% had someone living alone who was 65 years of age or older. The average household size was 2.53 and the average family size was 3.15.

In the town, the population was spread out, with 30.9% under the age of 18, 8.5% from 18 to 24, 24.6% from 25 to 44, 21.7% from 45 to 64, and 14.3% who were 65 years of age or older. The median age was 34 years. For every 100 females, there were 82.7 males. For every 100 females age 18 and over, there were 85.9 males.

The median income for a household in the town was $20,000, and the median income for a family was $25,750. Males had a median income of $25,000 versus $13,250 for females. The per capita income for the town was $10,023. About 19.7% of families and 27.0% of the population were below the poverty line, including 26.9% of those under age 18 and 31.9% of those age 65 or over.

Notable people
 Sim Iness - Olympic gold medalist and world record holder for the discus.
 Major General Sidney Marks - distinguished WWII infantry officer and All-American wrestler.

References

Towns in Haskell County, Oklahoma
Towns in Oklahoma
Oklahoma populated places on the Arkansas River
Populated places established in 1904